James King (23 May 1851 – 28 June 1921) was an Australian cricketer. He played in eight first-class matches for South Australia between 1872 and 1885.

See also
 List of South Australian representative cricketers

References

External links
 

1851 births
1921 deaths
Australian cricketers
South Australia cricketers
Cricketers from Adelaide